La Lande-sur-Eure is a former commune in the Orne department in north-western France. On 1 January 2016, it was merged into the new commune of Longny les Villages.
La Lande-sur-Eure is located in the canton of Tourouvre and in the arrondissement of Mortagne-au-Perche. Its zip code is 61290.

See also
Communes of the Orne department

References

Landesureure